Robert Lewin (May 9, 1920 – August 28, 2004) was an American screenwriter and television producer. He was nominated for an Academy Award for The Bold and the Brave, and Emmy nominated for the television series The Paper Chase and Baretta.

Early life
Robert Lewin was born in New York, and went on to attend Yale University before serving as an officer in the United States Army during the Second World War. He subsequently became a reporter for both Life magazine and the Atlanta Constitution.  Following that, he formed a publicity firm, Lewin, Kaufman and Schwartz, with Leonard Kaufman and Marving Schwartz.  Lewin and his wife, Elyse, had three children, Cheryl, James and Lian.

Screenwriting
Following his experiences during the Second World War, as a captain commanding an anti-tank unit, he wrote the screenplay for The Bold and the Brave. It was his first screenplay, and he was subsequently nominated for an Academy Award for Best Original Screenplay.

He moved on to write for television, working on a variety of shows including winning awards from the Writers Guild of America in both 1968 and 1969 for his work on Judd, for the Defense. He also worked as a producer and was nominated for Emmy Awards for The Paper Chase and Baretta. In January 1987, he was invited to be a producer on Star Trek: The Next Generation by the franchise creator, Gene Roddenberry. The pair had previously worked together on the original Mission: Impossible television series. Lewin's work on that series included co-writing the episode "Datalore", which was the final episode of Star Trek written by Roddenberry. The other episodes that he was credited for writing were "Symbiosis", "11001001" and "The Arsenal of Freedom". Lewin retired after working on the show during the first season, with Maurice Hurley hired to replace him as head writer.

Notes

References

External links

1920 births
2004 deaths
American male screenwriters
Writers from New York City
Yale University alumni
Journalists from New York City
Deaths from lung cancer
United States Army personnel of World War II
American male non-fiction writers
Screenwriters from New York (state)
20th-century American male writers
20th-century American screenwriters